Ismaïl Moalla (born 30 January 1990 in Sfax) is a Tunisian male volleyball player. He is part of the Tunisia men's national volleyball team. He competed with the national team at the 2012 Summer Olympics in London, Great Britain. He played with CS Sfaxien in 2012.

Clubs
  CS Sfaxien (2012)
Shahrdari Arak(Iran)2017-18

See also
 Tunisia at the 2012 Summer Olympics

References

1990 births
Living people
Tunisian men's volleyball players
Volleyball players at the 2012 Summer Olympics
Olympic volleyball players of Tunisia
People from Sfax
Mediterranean Games silver medalists for Tunisia
Mediterranean Games medalists in volleyball
Competitors at the 2013 Mediterranean Games
Volleyball players at the 2020 Summer Olympics